Renato Borghetti (born July 23, 1963 in Porto Alegre) is a Brazilian folk musician and composer.

He works in many genres including traditional styles from his home state of Rio Grande do Sul, other styles of Brazilian music like samba, and international genres like jazz and European classical music. His main instrument is the diatonic button accordion (gaita). He won a Latin Grammy in 2005 for Best Brazilian Roots/Regional Album, for his album Gaita Ponto Com.

In 2009 he performed at the Womex festival.

Discography
1984 - Gaita Ponto - RNS Discos
1985 - Renato Borghetti - Som Livre
1987 - Renato Borghetti - RCA Victor 
1988 - Esse tal de Borghettinho - RCA/BMG-Ariola
1989 - Renato Borghetti - Chantecler/Continental
1990 - O Melhor de Renato Borghetti - Som Livre
1991 - Borghetti - Continental 
1992 - Pensa que Berimbau é Gaita? - RBS Discos
1993 - Renato Borghetti - RGE
1993 - Instrumental no CCBB (with Hermeto Paschoal) - RGE
1994 - Accordionist - Prestige Records
1995 - As 20 Melhores de Renato Borghetti - RGE 
1996 - Gaúcho - RGE 
1998 - Gauderiando - RGE
1999 - Ao Ritmo de Tio Bilia - RBS Discos/Som Livre
2001 - Paixão no Peito
2002 - Ao Vivo em Viena
2002 - Umberto Petrin & Renato Borghetti - Reunião
2002 - SESC São Paulo - A Música Brasileira Deste Século Por Seus Autores e Intérpretes
2005 - Gaitapontocom
2005 - Gaúchos (Quinton Recorde Viena)
2007 - Fandango
2011 - Andanças - Live in Brussels - Saphrane
2016 - Gaita na Fábrica - Sounds from the Squeezebox Factory - Saphrane

References

External links 
 

1963 births
Brazilian composers
20th-century Brazilian male singers
20th-century Brazilian singers
Culture in Rio Grande do Sul
Living people
People from Rio Grande do Sul
21st-century Brazilian male singers
21st-century Brazilian singers